National Security College may refer to:
National Security College (Israel)
National Security College (Turkey)
National Security College (Australia), part of the Australian National University
National Security College (Pakistan)